Vestre Viken Hospital Trust is a health trust which covers Buskerud, Asker and Bærum. The trust is owned by Southern and Eastern Norway Regional Health Authority and is headquartered in Drammen. It covers an area with 470,000 residents in 26 municipalities. Vestre Viken has 9,500 employees.

Vestre Viken operates Bærum Hospital, Drammen Hospital, Kongsberg Hospital and Ringerike Hospital in Hønefoss. It also operates them medical center Hallingdal Hospital in Ål. It also runs the ambulance service with fifteen bases.

Drammen Hospital

Drammen Hospital, previously Buskerud Central Hospital, is a general hospital situated in Drammen, Norway. It is the largest hospital which is part of Vestre Viken Hospital Trust, part of the Southern and Eastern Norway Regional Health Authority.

It can no longer be used by the 330 Squadron and their Westland Sea King helicopters after an expansion of the parking lot in 2012.

References

Health trusts of Norway
Hospitals established in 2009
Government agencies established in 2009
Companies based in Drammen
2009 establishments in Norway